Mohammad Aghebati (Persian: محمد عاقبتی, born: 1975) is an Iranian theater director, scenic designer and actor. He has staged numerous dramas during his career, including Oedipus the King by Sophocles, AKA Jocasta; God’s Dead Words, Hamlet, The Prince of Grief by William Shakespeare, and Kiss You and Tears by Vaclav Havel.

Aghebati graduated from Tehran University of Art majoring in theater directing in 2000. Upon graduation, he became a member of the Leev Theater Group. After departure from Leev Theatre Group, he moved to New York and started a special research fellowship at Yale University, School of Drama. He then followed his education by obtaining his M.F.A in Performance and Media Arts at Brooklyn College, New York.

Agehbati is the co-founder and artistic director of Maaa Theater which is currently active in New York and Tehran.

Career

Director & Set Designer    

 Apart-Ment @ African American Arts and Culture Complex, New York, NY
 The Little Black Fish @ Madison Square Park Children Festival(2018), New York, NY
 Where Do We Come From? @ Art House (2018), Tehran, Iran
 King Lear @ Iranshahr Theater (2017), Tehran, Iran
 The Little Black Fish @ Downtown Arts (2016), New York, NY 
 Blackout @ Charles Eisemann Center (2016), Dallas, TX
 I Was King Richard (Based on Shakespeare’s Richard II) @ Tehran International Fadjr Theater Festival (2016), Tehran, Iran 
 Hamlet, Prince of Grief  @ Under The Radar, Public Theater (2013), New York, NY
 Opera Mani & Mana @Vahdat hall, world children  (2012), Tehran, Iran 
 Skellig and Children of the Fly (Based on “Skellig” by David Almond) By Mehdi Kushki @ City Theater (2012), Tehran, Iran
 Woman from the Past @ City Theater (2012), Tehran, Iran
 Simorgh (Based on Attar's Conference of the Birds) @ Vahdat Hall for Universal children Day (2011), Tehran, Iran
 Childhood Songs @Iranshahr Theater  (2011), Tehran, Iran
 Peter Avhh Testimony @ Khorram Abad Theater  (2010), Khorramabad, Iran
 Arash (Based on “The Book Of Kings”) @Vahdat hall, World Children Day (2010), Tehran, Iran
 Voice Room By Reza Soroor @ Leev Theater (2010), Tehran, Iran
 The Sky of Snowy Days (Based on “Bonnie & Clyde” script by Robert Benton and David Newman) By Mohammad Charmshir @ City Theater (2009), Tehran, Iran
 Only God Has the Right to Wake Me Up (Based on "Oscar and the lady in Pink" by Éric-Emmanuel Schmitt) By Mohammad Charmshir (2008), Tehran, Iran
 Jocasta; or God’s Dead Words (2008), Tokyo, Japan
 Only God Has the Right to Wake Me Up (Based on "Oscar and the lady in Pink" by Éric-Emmanuel Schmitt) By Mohammad Charmshir (2006), Berlin, Germany
 Raiders to the Sea By J.M Synge @ Iran National TV (2006), Tehran, Iran
 I Have to Go, I am Too Late (Based on a novel by Patrick Modiano) By Mohammad Charmshir (2005), Tehran, Iran 
 Kiss You and Tears (Based on Vaclav Havel's letters) By Mohammad Charmshir (2003), Heidelberg, Germany
 The Maids By Jean Genet @ Fadjr Theater Festival (2001), Tehran, Iran
 Purgatory By William Butler Yeats @ Fadjr Theater Festival (2000), Tehran, Iran

Honor & Awards and Nominations 

 Best Director and Set Design from Hamedan International Theater for Children and Youth 2018
 Brooklyn Art Council Grant for The Little Black Fish 2018
 NYSCA grant for The Little Black Fish 2017
 LabWorks Artist @ New Victory Theater for The Little Black Fish 2016
 Nominated for the Best Children performance @ The National Critiques Circle for Skellig and Children of Fly, 2013
 Nominated for the Best Designer @ The National Critiques Circle for Skellig and Children of Fly, 2013
 Won Best Director @15th International Festival of Theater for Children & Youth, Isfahan – Iran Only God has the Right to     Wake me Up, 2008
 Nominated for the best Set and costume Design @15th International Festival of Theater for Children & Youth, Isfahan – Iran, Only God has the Right to Wake me Up, 2008
 Won Best Director @ 22nd International Fadjr Theatre Festival, Tehran Kiss You and Tears, 2004
 Won Best Performance @22nd International Fadjr Theatre Festival, Tehran Kiss You and Tears 2004
 Awarded the Medal of Honor from President Khatami as Iran’s successful Young Theater Artist for his direction of Kiss You and Tears, 2004
 Won Best Director @20th International Fadjr Student Theatre Festival, Tehran The Maids, 2002
 Won Best Performance @20th International Fadjr Student Theatre Festival, Tehran, The Maids, 2002
 Won Best Director @18th International Fadjr Student Theatre Festival, Tehran Purgatory, 2000
 Won Best Performance @18th International Fadjr Student Theatre Festival Purgatory, 2000

References

External links

 Fadjr International Theater Festival Official Website
 Under the Radar Festival 2013
 RIAF: The complicated logistics of an international arts festival
 Censorship mars Iranian theatre: dramatist
 Lions and Elephants and Penguins, Oh My! RIAF Gets the Scoop on Leev Theater Group’s “Hamlet, Prince of Grief”
 Interview with Iranian director Mohammad Aghebati.
 Japan Foundation Performing Arts News
 Asia Society Symposium: The Shiraz Arts Festival: A Global Vision Revisited
    Review Symposium: The Shiraz Arts Festival: A Global Vision Revisited
 Iranian play ‘Jocasta’ faces criticism
  Trilogy on stage
  A unique blend of art at the 9th Bharat Rang Mahotsav
 Greek tragedy raises 3,000-year-old questions

1975 births
Iranian theatre directors
Iranian dramatists and playwrights
Living people
Tehran University of Art alumni